Eric Crume (born October 18, 1993) is an American football defensive tackle who is currently a free agent. He played college football at Syracuse.

Early years
Crume attended Central High School in Detroit, Michigan where he graduated in 2011.

College career
Coming out of high school Crume committed to play football at Syracuse University. Crume played as a true freshman and played all four years at Syracuse, playing in 43 games over those four years.

Professional career

Jacksonville Jaguars
On May 2, 2015, after going undrafted, Crume tweeted that he had signed with the Jacksonville Jaguars. On August 29, 2015 Crume was waived by the Jacksonville Jaguars as part of their roster cuts to get the roster size to 75 players.

Green Bay Packers
On November 10, 2015, Crume was signed to the Green Bay Packers' practice squad to take the place of Justin Hamilton. On November 17, 2015 Crume was waived from the practice squad to make room for B.J. McBryde.

Carolina Panthers
On January 6, 2016, Crume signed a futures contract with the Carolina Panthers. On September 3, 2016, he was waived by the Panthers as part of final roster cuts and was signed to the practice squad the next day. After spending the entire season on the practice squad, Crume signed a reserve/future contract with the Panthers on January 2, 2017.

On September 2, 2017, Crume was waived by the Panthers and was signed to the practice squad the next day. He was released on September 14, 2017.

References

External links
Carolina Panthers bio
Syracuse Orange bio

1993 births
Living people
Central High School (Detroit) alumni
Players of American football from Detroit
American football defensive tackles
Syracuse Orange football players
Carolina Panthers players